Raymond James French, MBE (born 23 December 1939) is an English former rugby league and rugby union footballer who played in the 1950s and 1960s. French played at international level in both codes.

After training as a school teacher, he taught at Cowley School in St. Helens, Lancashire, where his local counterparts included Brian Ashton who taught at Stonyhurst College.

French was a commentator on rugby league on both television and radio. He is well known for his range of colloquialisms. French is regularly heard on the Rugby League show Try Time each Thursday on BBC Radio Merseyside giving his views on the state of the game in his forthright way. He retired in 2019.

In 2010, French received the Mike Gregory Spirit of Rugby League Award to mark his contribution to the game.

Also President of the St Helens Past Players' Association, French was appointed Member of the Order of the British Empire (MBE) in the 2011 New Year Honours for services to rugby league.

Playing career

Championship final appearances
Ray French played left- in St. Helens' 35–12 victory over Halifax in the Championship Final during the 1965–66 season at Station Road, Swinton on Saturday 28 May 1966, in front of a crowd of 30,165.

Challenge Cup Final appearances
Ray French played left- in St. Helens' 21–2 victory over Wigan in the 1966 Challenge Cup Final during the 1965–66 season at Wembley Stadium, London on Saturday 21 May 1966, in front of a crowd of 98,536.

County Cup Final appearances
Ray French played right- in St. Helens' 25–9 victory over Swinton in the 1961 Lancashire Cup Final  at Central Park, Wigan on Saturday 11 November 1961; played left- in the 15–4 victory over Leigh in the 1963 Lancashire Cup Final  at Station Road, Swinton on Saturday 26 October 1963, and played left- in the 12–4 victory over Swinton in the 1964 Lancashire Cup  Final atCentral Park, Wigan on Saturday 24 October 1964.

BBC2 Floodlit Trophy Final appearances
Ray French played left- in St. Helens' 0–4 defeat by Castleford in the 1965 BBC2 Floodlit Trophy Final at Knowsley Road, St. Helens on Tuesday 14 December 1965.

Ray French Award
In August 2019 the Rugby Football League ran a poll among fans on the Our League app to name a trophy for the man of the match award in the 1895 Cup Final. French was one of three names in the poll along with Willie Horne and Johnny Whiteley. French won the poll with over 60% of the votes cast and presented the award at the inaugural final on 24 August 2019 to Sheffield's Anthony Thackeray.

Award winners
2019 Anthony Thackeray - Sheffield Eagles
2020 Not awarded - no competition played due to the COVID-19 pandemic
2021 Craig Hall - Featherstone Rovers

References

External links
Statistics at en.espn.co.uk
Saints Heritage Society profile
Widnes RLFC Player Profile

1939 births
Living people
BBC sports presenters and reporters
British sports broadcasters
Dual-code rugby internationals
England international rugby union players
English rugby league commentators
English rugby league players
English rugby union players
Great Britain national rugby league team players
Members of the Order of the British Empire
Rugby league players from St Helens, Merseyside
Rugby league second-rows
Rugby union locks
Rugby union players from St Helens, Merseyside
Schoolteachers from Lancashire
St Helens R.F.C. players
Widnes Vikings players
Liverpool St Helens F.C. players